{{Infobox school
 | name                    = Kent College, Canterbury
 | image                   = 
 | image_size              = 1000x720
 | coordinates             = 
 | motto                   = Lux Tua Via Mea
 | established             = 1885
 | closed                  = 
 | type                    = Public SchoolPrivate day and boarding school
 | religious_affiliation   = Methodist
 | president               = 
 | head_label              = 
 | head                    = 
 | headmaster              = Mark Turnbull
 | chair_label             = 
 | chair                   = 
 | founder                 = 
 | specialist              = 
 | address                 = Whitstable Road
 | city                    = Canterbury, Kent
 | country                 = England
 | postcode                = CT2 9DT
 | local_authority         = 
 | ofsted                  = 
 | staff                   = 
 | enrolment               = 
 | gender                  = 
 | lower_age               = 11
 | upper_age               = 18
 | houses                  = Marlowe, Augustine, Becket, Chaucer
 | colours                 =    Maroon, red, navy
 | publication             = Kent College Times | free_label_1            = Former Pupils
 | free_1                  = Old Canterburians
 | free_label_2            = Houses
 | free_2                  = Boys: Elfick, Gamon, Guilford. Girls: Austen, Wesley
 | free_label_3            = 
 | website                 = 
}}

Kent College, Canterbury is a co-educational private school for boarding and day pupils between the ages of 3 months and 18 years. It was founded in 1885, and is a member of the Headmasters' and Headmistresses' Conference. Originally established as a boys' public school, it admitted girls into the sixth form in 1973 and since 1975 it has been fully co-educational.

These are adjacent to Blean Forest.

Its junior school is located about a mile away, and provides day school education for boys and girls between the ages of 3 and 11, and boarding for children aged 7 and above.

Kent College Dubai is a secondary campus of the Canterbury school which is located in Meydan City. The college opened in September 2016. It was announced in 2018 that a further overseas campus was to be opened in Hong Kong.

History
The school was founded in 1885 as the Wesleyan College, Canterbury. Built on land being made available by Edward Pillow, a local gentleman-farmer – recognition of which endures by way of the school's "Pillow Prize" – the foundation stone for the main building was laid in 1887. The architect was Charles Bell. In 1920 Kent College was acquired by the Board of Management for Methodist Residential Schools. Buildings forming a quadrangle were subsequently erected to the rear of the main building and the chapel. In 1945, the school became a direct grant grammar school.

An increase in the number of pupils through the twentieth century, attributable in part to the admittance of girls, necessitated the construction of, among other buildings, three boarding houses.

BuildingsMain Building, Chapel and School House:
The Main Building, which accommodates School House, and the School Room, which was converted for use as a chapel in 1936, were constructed in two stages in 1887 and 1900. The stained-glass windows in the chapel depict things incorporated in the school's badge. In 1938 a fire, which broke out when the master on duty was at the cinema in Canterbury, caused substantial damage to the Main Building; the central spire collapsed and was not replaced during reconstruction.Prickett Building:
Named after John Prickett, a former headmaster. The building was used for the Kent College Junior School. It is recorded in the "Kent College Centenary Book" that during the construction of the Prickett Building, difficulties arose because of the presence of an underground spring.Science Block:
The Science Block was constructed in 1958 by the school, financed by parents, friends and Old Canterburians in addition to a contribution from the Industrial Fund."Glasshouse" classrooms:
The "Glasshouse classrooms", at the north side of the Quad., were opened by James Chuter-Ede, Baron Chuter-Ede of Epsom (Home Secretary in Clement Attlee's Labour Government), and have been refurbished to accommodate the Sixth Form Centre.Centenary Building:
The foundation stone of the Centenary Building was laid by John Prickett. The building contained the school Library until the Library was relocated in 2005 to the first floor of the Main Building; the Music Department occupies the Centenary Building today.Wesley House:
Named to recall the ethos of Kent College, the boarding house for girls was opened by David and Olive Norfolk in 1978.Norfolk Building:
Named after David Norfolk, a former headmaster, who opened the building (constructed on the site of the open-air swimming pool).Guilford House:
Named for the Earl of Guilford; the Countess of Guilford opened the boys' boarding house on Speech Day in 1964.Moat House (no longer in Kent College's possession):
Moat House was acquired as part of the Moat Estate (the acquisition of which came about through the donations of Old Canterburians in the face of a refusal by the Board of Management in the 1940s to finance it). Before Kent College acquired the house it had been rented for convalescence by Virginia Woolf, who complained in one of her letters that "we had our windows prised open. The decay of centuries had sealed them. No human force can now shut them. Thus we sit exposed to wind and wet by day and by night we are invaded by flocks of white moths. The rain falls, and the birds never give over singing, and hot sulphur fumes rise from the valleys, and the red cow in the field roars for her calf...". The house was used as the headmaster's residence until the late 1970s, when it was sold by the school to finance the construction of Wesley House.

 School 
Kent College is a Methodist school, although it accepts pupils of all religions. Originally established as a boys' school, it took girls into the sixth form in 1973, and since 1975 it has been fully co-educational. Kent College has thirteen independent "sister schools" in Great Britain, most of which are co-educational though three, including Kent College, Pembury, are girls' schools.

The school badge shows the three black choughs taken from the arms of Thomas Beckett and 'invicta' the white horse of the county of Kent.

Inspection

In 2009 the school was subject to an independent school inspection. The report observed with regard to the Senior School that "the school provides an excellent quality of education"; "the school is able to adapt the curriculum to suit the learning needs of individual pupils"; "the school achieves its aims to enable pupils to maximise their potential and to attain high levels of achievement"; "the quality of teaching...is high"; "pastoral care and the provision for the welfare, health and safety of pupils are outstanding"; "links with parents and the community are excellent, as is the boarding education"; and "the school has no major weaknesses".

In 2015 the school was subject to another independent school inspection, in which all areas of the school were judged to be 'excellent in every aspect'.

 Houses 
The School introduced separate boarding and sporting Houses during the 1990s. Boarders are sorted into both a boarding House and a sporting House, whilst day pupils are only sorted into a sporting House.

There are four sporting Houses:

 Marlowe House 
 Chaucer House 
 Becket House 
 Augustine House

There are five boarding houses at the senior school site:

 Elfick House – Boys
 Gamon House – Boys
 Guilford House – Boys
 Austen House – Girls
 Wesley House – Girls

In 2011 boarding at Kent College was rated as outstanding by OfSted.

Two other boarding Houses became defunct during the 1990s:

 Lower School
 Milton House

Lower School was originally the designated boarding house for all boarders in the first and second years (Years 7 and 8). In 1996, Lower School was closed, and the Prickett Building was redeveloped as classrooms; the boarders were moved to Milton House (boys) and Austen House (girls). At the start of the 1997–1998 academic year, Milton House was combined with School House, as both Houses were located in the main school building, albeit on separate floors.

 List of headmasters 
Mark Turnbull joined the school as Head in January 2022.

Below are listed the former headmasters of Kent College from 1885 to 2021:

 J. Deaville (1885–1888)
 L.W. Posnett (1888–1893)
 J. Smallpage (1893–1897)
 F.M. Facer (1897–1911)
 A. Brownscombe (1911–1934)
 H.J. Prickett (1934–1960)
 D.E. Norfolk (1960–1977)
 P.E. Sangster (1977–1979)
 R.J. Wicks (1980–1995)
 E.B. Halse (1995–2002)
 G.G. Carminati (2002–2007)
 D.J Lamper (2007–2022)
 M. Turnbull (2022–Present)

Two school buildings have been named after previous headmasters, John Prickett and David Norfolk.

 Chaplaincy 
As Kent College is a Methodist school, Chapel holds a key place in the day (pupils, whatever faith they profess, are required to attend Chapel) and services are given by the chaplain, the headmaster or a visiting minister. The current Chaplain of Kent College is Alison Walker.

 Junior School 

The Kent College Infant and Junior School in the village of Harbledown, was formerly the home of the Victorian artist Thomas Sidney Cooper R.A., and was purchased by the Senior School in 1945. It has approximately 220 pupils, and the headmaster is Simon James.

Old Canterburians (notable students)

Former pupils of the school are known as Old Canterburians, and are entitled to use "O.C." in any post-nominal letters. Kent College administers the Old Canterburian Club, which puts on events throughout the year to which O.C.s are invited, and encourages former pupils to maintain contact with the school. The "Kent College Times" publishes a section devoted to news from the Old Canterburian Club. Among the Kent College alumni:

 Chris Albertson, American jazz historian
 Guy Berryman, bass player for British music band Coldplay
 Tim Clark, President Emirates Airline
 Ptolemy Dean, architect, and resident "ruin detective" on the BBC television programme, "Restoration"
 Tacita Dean, English visual artist
 Simon Dingemans, banker and businessman.
 Thomas Dunhill, English composer and writer
 David Eades, BBC journalist and newsreader
 Natascha Engel, Labour Member of Parliament, Deputy Speaker of the House of Commons, Second Deputy Chairman of Ways and Means
 Thomas Godfrey Evans, cricketer, for Kent and England
 Christopher Fairbank, actor, best known for his role in hit comedy-drama series Auf Wiedersehen, Pet Piers Francis, English rugby union fly-half for the Auckland Blues
 Reginald Hine, solicitor and historian
 John Inge, Bishop of Worcester
 John Redwood, Conservative Member of Parliament for Wokingham
 Simon Scarrow, historical fiction author
 Anthony Scrivener, British barrister.
 Pat Vaulkhard, cricketer for Derbyshire and Nottinghamshire
 Mike Weatherley, Conservative Member of Parliament for Hove
 Mimi Webb (Amelia Webb), Singer songwriter signed to Epic Records
 Raymond Yiu, Composer and conductor
 Angus So, English composer and writer

Further readingThe Kent College Centenary Book, written by Christopher Wright, a former head of history at the school, traces the 100 years from the founding of Kent College, through the two world wars, the "Great Fire" that destroyed part of the Main Building in 1938, evacuation to Truro, the building programme and the problems of the 1960s, to the co-educational school it was in 1985. 10,001 Facts about Kent College was the official supplement to Christopher Wright's Centenary Book, and was published in the same year. It was compiled by A.P.L. Slater.The Kent College Times'': This takes the place of the "Bulletin", and communicates news from the preceding term, with an introduction by the headmaster.

The School Magazine: The first edition, under the name "The Rampant", was published in 1895.

References

External links

 Kent College website
 Old Canterburians' website

Private schools in Kent
Member schools of the Headmasters' and Headmistresses' Conference
Schools in Canterbury
Methodist schools in England
Boarding schools in Kent
International Baccalaureate schools in England
Educational institutions established in 1885
1885 establishments in England